Anthony Michael Jasick (born April 17, 1978) is the former men's basketball head coach at Jacksonville. He was previously the head coach at IPFW. He was the third head coach at the NCAA Division I level for the Mastodons.

Early life and education
Born and raised in Whitehall, Michigan, Jasick graduated from Whitehall High School in 1996. Jasick played point guard at Whitehall. After high school, Jasick attended Muskegon Community College and also played basketball there before transferring to Mars Hill College, where he graduated with a B.S. in biology education in 2000. Jasick later completed a master's in education in 2002 at Lincoln Memorial University.

Coaching career
Jasick began his coaching career in 2002 at the Division II level as a volunteer assistant at North Alabama. In 2003, Jasick became an assistant at Newberry College before getting his first Division I job as an assistant at Middle Tennessee under Kermit Davis in 2004–05.

From 2005 to 2011, Jasick was an assistant at IPFW as the school moved from independence to the Summit League in the 2007–08 season. On April 20, 2011, IPFW promoted Jasick to head coach. Originally signed to a five-year contract in 2011, Jasick got an extension through the 2017–18 season on October 10, 2013 following a 16-win season in 2012–13, the program's most wins in 20 seasons. Two months later, IPFW got its first ranking in the Collegeinsider.com Mid-Major Top 25. On January 2, 2014, IPFW beat Bowling Green on the road 65–60 for the program's first road win over a MAC opponent. IPFW finished the season 25–11 and made the second round of the 2014 CollegeInsider.com Postseason Tournament.

On April 9, 2014, Jacksonville University hired Jasick as head coach. Jacksonville improved from 10–22 in Jasick's first season in 2014–15 to 16–16 in 2015–16. Jasick was fired on March 8, 2021.

Head coaching record

References

1978 births
Living people
American men's basketball players
Basketball coaches from Michigan
Basketball players from Michigan
College men's basketball head coaches in the United States
Purdue Fort Wayne Mastodons men's basketball coaches
Jacksonville Dolphins men's basketball coaches
Junior college men's basketball players in the United States
Lincoln Memorial University alumni
Mars Hill University alumni
Middle Tennessee Blue Raiders men's basketball coaches
North Alabama Lions men's basketball coaches
People from Whitehall, Michigan
Point guards